"You're a Mean One, Mr. Grinch" is a Christmas song that was originally written and composed for the 1966 animated special Dr. Seuss' How the Grinch Stole Christmas!.

History
The lyrics were written by 
Theodor "Dr. Seuss" Geisel, the music was composed by Albert Hague, and the song was performed by Thurl Ravenscroft.

Because Ravenscroft was not credited in the closing credits of the special, it is often mistakenly attributed to Boris Karloff, who served as narrator and the voice of the Grinch in the special but who himself was not a trained singer. Until Ravenscroft was publicly credited, Tennessee Ernie Ford was also speculated to be the voice behind the song.

The soundtrack to the special won the Grammy Award for Best Album for Children at the 10th Annual Grammy Awards.

The song has been incorporated into most other adaptations of the story. In the 2000 live-action film, Jim Carrey performs the song in character as the Grinch, singing about himself. The stage musical adaptation included the song in the score, among several other original numbers composed specifically for that production. The 2018 CGI animated film features a substantially updated version of the song from Tyler, the Creator featuring an orchestral arrangement by Danny Elfman.

The song was also covered by New Jersey alternative rock band the Whirling Dervishes. Writer Chris Jordan of the Asbury Park Press called their version "wonderfully depraved in the best of holiday ways" and noted that their version became a Jersey classic.

Other artists who have recorded versions include Cee Lo Green with Straight No Chaser, Aimee Mann, Pentatonix and Lindsey Stirling.

Charts

Glee cast version

Thurl Ravenscroft version

References

External links
 Lyrics to "You're a Mean One, Mr. Grinch" (TV version)
 Lyrics to "You're a Mean One, Mr. Grinch" (Soundtrack version)

American Christmas songs
Works by Dr. Seuss
1966 songs
Christmas novelty songs
Songs about fictional male characters
Songs written for films
Music based on short fiction
Tyler, the Creator songs
The Grinch (franchise)